The Goldens was an American country music duo from Brewton, Alabama composed of brothers Rusty and Chris Golden. Rusty and Chris are the sons of William Lee Golden. Before forming The Goldens, Chris was a member of Cedar Creek and Rusty was a member of The Boys Band. Supporting musicians in The Goldens included Greg Gordon, Don Breland, John Rich, Skip Mitchell, Buster Phillips and John Sturdivant, Jr.

The Goldens' self-titled debut album was released by Epic Records in 1987. Two singles from the album, Put Us Together Again and Sorry Girls charted on the Billboard Hot Country Singles & Tracks chart. The Goldens moved to Capitol/SBK Records for the release of their second album, Rush for Gold, in 1990. The album produced three charting singles and videos, 'Take Me Back To The Country', 'Keep The Faith', and 'Long Gone'. Since disbanding, Rusty has released three solo albums and continues  to write songs. Rusty was awarded Songwriter of the Year trophies from SGMA, and two Song of the Year awards for 'I Want To Thank You' by Karen Peck and New River, and 'What Salvation's Done For Me'  by the Booth Brothers. Chris has  continued work as session musicians. later joining the Oak Ridge Boys band from 1996 to 2014. As a sideman Chris has also performed with country music's Restless Heart and legendary band Alabama. Chris has released eight solo albums, five videos, garnered six No. 1 Gospel singles, two top five, and won several awards including 2019 Entertainer of the Year at the Inspirational Country Music Awards, 2019 Country Gospel Artist of the Year from AGM.

Discography

Albums

Singles

Music videos

References

Country music groups from Alabama
Capitol Records artists
Country music duos
Epic Records artists
Musical groups established in 1987
Musical groups disestablished in 1991
Sibling musical duos
American musical duos